Utkarsh Sharma (born 22 May 1994) is an Indian actor. The son of director Anil Sharma, he made his first screen appearance as a child in the 2001 Blockbuster film Gadar: Ek Prem Katha, which starred Sunny Deol and Ameesha Patel. As an adult and lead actor, he made his debut with action thriller film Genius.

Life and career
Utkarsh Sharma is the son of Bollywood director Anil Sharma, who is well known for his movie Gadar: Ek Prem Katha. He has studied Bachelors of Fine Arts in Production and Direction from Chapman University USA, and Method Non Acting from Lee Strasberg Theatre and Film Institute. After working as Charanjeet in Gadar: Ek Prem Katha, Utkarsh is playing a lead role in the movie Genius (2018 film), an Indian action thriller with co-star Ishitha Chauhan. Utkarsh character in the movie Genius (2018 film) is an orphan from Mathura and Vrindavan area in Uttar Pradesh, who lives with priests. He is into Bhagavad Gita and science so has his own unique philosophy. The movie Genius (2018 film) is set to release on 24 August 2018, directed by Anil Sharma and produced by Soham Rockstar Entertainment. The movie also stars Nawazuddin Siddiqui along with veteran Mithun Chakraborty.

Utkarsh Sharma Is A Trained Dancer And Loves To Play Football

Filmography

References

External links 
 
 

1994 births
21st-century Indian male actors
Male actors from Mumbai
Living people
Indian male film actors